Windsor is an unincorporated community in Stutsman County, in the U.S. state of North Dakota.

History
A post office called Windsor was established in 1883, and remained in operation until 1975. The community was named after Windsor, Ontario.

References

Unincorporated communities in Stutsman County, North Dakota
Unincorporated communities in North Dakota